The Col d'Agnes (elevation ) is a mountain pass in the French Pyrenees in the department of Ariège, between the communities of  Aulus-les-Bains (west), Massat (north) and Vicdessos (east).

Details of climb

Approximately  from the summit is the junction with the climb to the Port de Lers.

Appearances in Tour de France
The Col d'Agnes was first used in the Tour de France in 1988, since when it has featured five times, most recently in 2011, when the leader over the summit was Sylvain Chavanel.

References

External links
 Profile from Aulus-les-Bains
 Profile from Massat

Mountain passes of Ariège (department)
Mountain passes of the Pyrenees